Waltham Highlands station is a former railroad station in Waltham, Massachusetts. Originally established by the Central Massachusetts Railroad, it was incorporated into the MBTA Commuter Rail with MBTA subsidies in 1965. It was located on Hammond Street north of the Waltham town center. It was closed on November 26, 1971, when service on the Central Mass Branch was terminated due to poor track conditions and low ridership. The station building remains, with some modifications, and is used as an insurance agency.

References

External links

Station building on Google Maps Street View

1971 disestablishments in Massachusetts
1881 establishments in Massachusetts
Former MBTA stations in Massachusetts
MBTA Commuter Rail stations in Middlesex County, Massachusetts
Railway stations in the United States opened in 1881
Railway stations closed in 1971
Waltham, Massachusetts